Sobelivirales is an order of RNA viruses which infect eukaryotes. Member viruses have a positive-sense single-stranded RNA genome. The name of the group is a portmanteau of member orders "sobemovirus-like" and -virales which is the suffix for a virus order.

Taxonomy
The following families are recognized:
Alvernaviridae
Barnaviridae
Solemoviridae

References

Viruses